Guillermo Cañas and Rainer Schüttler were the defending champions but they competed with different partners that year, Cañas with Younes El Aynaoui and Schüttler with Mikhail Youzhny.

Schüttler and Youzhny lost in the first round to Juan Ignacio Carrasco and Álex López Morón.

Cañas and El Aynaoui lost in the quarterfinals to Nicolás Lapentti and Jeff Tarango.

Joshua Eagle and David Rikl won in the final 6–3, 6–4 against David Adams and Gastón Etlis.

Seeds
Champion seeds are indicated in bold text while text in italics indicates the round in which those seeds were eliminated.

 Joshua Eagle /  David Rikl (champions)
 David Adams /  Gastón Etlis (final)
 Petr Luxa /  Cyril Suk (quarterfinals)
 Leoš Friedl /  Jiří Novák (first round)

Draw

External links
 2002 Mercedes Cup Doubles Draw

Doubles 2002
Stuttgart Open Doubles